The Great British Bake Off is a British television baking competition, produced by Love Productions. It premiered on BBC Two in 2010, then moved to BBC One in 2014, and then moved to Channel 4 in 2017. This list contains sections about annual winners and runners-up who appeared from series eight onward, which aired on Channel 4.

The information seen in tables, including age and occupation, are based on the time of filming.

Series 8 (2017)

Sophie Faldo (winner)
Sophie Faldo is a former British Army officer who was the winner of the eighth series in 2017, the first series to be broadcast on Channel 4.

Faldo was born in London and grew up in Suffolk. She studied psychology at the University of Manchester and Toulouse. She joined the Royal Artillery and has served in Afghanistan. After leaving the Army, she worked as a personal trainer, taught military boot camps, and was training to be a stuntwoman when she was convinced by her chef boyfriend to apply for The Great British Bake Off.

Faldo won the competition. Twelve hours before the final episode, judge Prue Leith accidentally tweeted the results.
 
She appeared in an episode of a TV series Travels with a Goat on Insight TV, travelling to southern Kenya with Spanish food vlogger Abraham Bandera Baez. She has started a business, Sophie Faldo Couture Cakes.

Faldo rowed to a high standard and was part of the Molesey Boat Club eight that won bronze at the 2011 British Rowing Championships.

Steven Carter-Bailey
Steven Carter-Bailey (born 1982/83), one of the runners-up of the eighth series, was a marketer from Watford, Hertfordshire, at the time of the competition.

Carter-Bailey re-competed against Tamal Ray (series seven), Candice Brown (series seven, winner), and Kate Henry (series five) for the 2018–19 New Year's special. He was crowned the special's winner.

Since Bake Off, Carter-Bailey worked for ITV London covering London bakeries and released his first podcast Feed My Curiosity in 2021.

Kate Lyon
Kate Lyon (born 1987/88), one of the runners-up of the eighth series, was a health and safety inspector from Merseyside at the time of the competition. As of September 2020, she studied for a master's degree in occupational health and safety.

Series 9 (2018)

One of contestants this series was absent on the fourth week, leading the judges to decide not to eliminate anyone in that person's absence.

Rahul Mandal (winner)
Rahul Mandal (born 1987) is an Indian baker and engineering researcher, who won the ninth series in 2018.  Mandal also works as an engineering researcher at the University of Sheffield's Nuclear Advanced Manufacturing Research Centre.

Mandal is an only child. Born in Howrah, India, his mother was a housewife and his father runs a business supplying engineering parts across India. Rahul graduated from the West Bengal University of Technology with a Bachelor's degree in electronics and communication engineering and then from the University of Calcutta with a master's degree in optics and optoelectronics. He came to the United Kingdom in 2010 on a scholarship to study for his PhD in Optical Metrology at Loughborough University and his thesis was on Calibration and Adjustment of Coherence Scanning Interferometry. He joined the Nuclear AMRC in 2015.

In 2018, Mandal won the ninth series, whose finals was viewed by 10 million households. He was then signed as a columnist for The Times Magazine, a part of the Saturday supplement of The Times, and occasionally cooks on the ITV daytime show This Morning. In 2018, Mandal became a self-declared STEM ambassador.

Mandal married his fiancee in Kolkata, India, on 5 December 2022.

Ruby Bhogal
Ruby Bhogal (born 1988/89), one of runners-up of the ninth series, is a project manager in London. Bhogal has written columns for GQ, The Luxury Lifestyle Magazine and GoodHomes. She re-competed for the 2020 Bake Off Christmas special against eliminated non-finalists Jamie Finn (series ten), Rosie Brandreth-Poynter (series ten), and James Hillery (series eight). She also made guest appearances in This Morning and Steph's Packed Lunch.

Kim-Joy
 
Kim-Joy Hewlett (born 1991), one of runners-up of the ninth series, was a psychological wellbeing practitioner at the time of the competition. She has since released three cookbooks and written a baking column for  The Guardian. She returned for The Great New Year Bake Off special, aired on 1 January 2022, against Jon Jenkins (series nine) and two other contestants of the eleventh series—Hermine and Rowan Williams. Kim-Joy was crowned its winner.

Series 10 (2019)

David Atherton (winner)
David Atherton was born in Whitby, North Yorkshire in 1983 and lived in the village of Ruswarp until he was 18. He has four siblings. He studied art and design before deciding on a career in healthcare and trained as a nurse. He has a post-graduate degree in wilderness and expedition medicine, and works as a health adviser for Voluntary Service Overseas. Atherton followed in the footsteps of his mum who volunteered for VSO in Papua New Guinea in the 1970s. Atherton has worked in various countries around the world, such as Côte d’Ivoire, Ethiopia, Papua New Guinea and Nigeria, including a stint as a clinical instructor in Malawi.

Atherton took part in the tenth series of The Great British Bake Off, encouraged by friends in his pottery class. He was crowned the winner.

Atherton started writing a cookery column for The Guardian in 2020 on food for fitness. His first book, titled My First Cookbook, is a children's cookbook published by Walker books in August 2020. In 2021, he published two additional follow-up versions for young cooks: My First Green Cookbook and Bake, Make, and Learn to Cook. In May 2021, he published Good to Eat, which focuses on delivering healthy twists to classic recipes.  

David lives in South London with his partner Nik Sariyski, who is a visual merchandising manager at Nike. He came out as gay at age 29.

Steph Blackwell
Steph Blackwell (born 21 January 1991), one of the runners-up of the tenth series, was a shop assistant at the time of the competition. Blackwell was awarded Star Baker four times. She has baked "simple and traditional" recipes.

Alice Fevronia
Alice Fevronia (born 1990/91), one of runners-up of the tenth series, was a geography teacher from London at the time of the competition. She has written column articles for the Delish website.

Series 11 (2020)

Peter Sawkins (winner)
Peter Sawkins (born 30 June 2000) is a Scottish baker and student from Currie, Edinburgh. He won the eleventh series in 2020, which was filmed under special circumstances due to the COVID-19 pandemic. He won the title of Star-Baker twice on the show and is known for his gluten-free and dairy-free fancies. He was the youngest contestant in the 2020 series, as well as the youngest winner and youngest finalist in the history of the competition.

Sawkins first became interested in baking at the age of 12 after watching the third series. He plays badminton, and has played in national competitions in the sport since 2012. He was a member of the 65th Edinburgh company of the Boys' Brigade. He was also president of the badminton club at the University of Edinburgh, where he studied accounting and finance.

His first cookbook, Peter Bakes, was published in October 2021.

Laura Adlington
Laura Adlington (born 1988/89), one of runners-up of the eleventh series, was a digital manager at the time of the competition. Due to her bakes throughout the series judged as often flavourful but poorly constructed and presented, her placement in the finals was widely criticised by viewers. Laura suffered from cyberbullying via social media. Judges Paul Hollywood and Prue Leith expressed support for Adlington. Via Instagram, Hollywood criticised the cyberbullying as "disgusting behaviour".

In May 2021, Adlington announced her extended interests in plus-size clothing, planning to show that such clothing is more than just "black and baggy" but rather "glamourous" and "nice".

Dave Friday
Dave Friday (born 1989/90), one of runners-up of the eleventh series, was a security guard at the time of the competition. Dave has a son born in 2020 to his fiancee, to whom he proposed in that same year in An Extra Slice.

Series 12 (2021)

Giuseppe Dell'Anno (winner)

Giuseppe Dell'Anno (born 1976), the winner of the twelfth series, was a chief engineer from Bristol and an industrial fellow of the University of Bristol at the time of the competition. He studied chemical engineering in the University of Pisa. He and his wife moved to the United Kingdom in 2002 and have resided there since.

Dell'Anno won Star Baker twice. Throughout the competition, his bakes were Italian-inspired. He became the first Italian to win the competition after presenting his Mad Hatter's Tea Party Showstopper, "What Is the Hatter with Me", featuring a brioche resembling a mushroom, panna cottas, heart-shaped muffins, and an asparagus and peas caterpillar-shaped choux. He wrote his 2022 cookbook Giuseppe's Italian Bakes. From that same year 2022 onward, he also wrote his regular column "Britalian Bake-Off Review" column for the Radio Times, recapping episodes of Bake Off.

Dell'Anno's father was a professional chef and has been diagnosed with Alzheimer's disease. Giuseppe is still married to his wife with three sons.

Chigs Parmar
Will Chirag Parmar (born 1980/81), nicknamed "Chigs", one of runners-up of the twelfth series, was a sales manager from Leicestershire at the time of the competition. Parmar started baking in 2020 during the COVID-19 pandemic. He won Star Baker twice. He has one sister.

Parmar returned for the 2023 Bake Off New Year special, competing against Lottie Bedlow (series eleven) and two other contestants of series nine—Antony Amourdoux and Manon Lagrève. Parmar lost to its winner Lagrève.

Crystelle Pereira
Crystelle Pereira (born 1995), one of runners-up of the twelfth series, was a client relationship manager from London at the time of the competition. Pereira is of a Portuguese and Goan descent. Her Portuguese-Goan parents were born in Kenya. She won Star Baker twice.

Series 13 (2022)

Syabira Yusoff (winner)
Syabira Yusoff was a London cardiovascular research associate of King's College London since 2019 at the time of competition. Yusoff was born in Malaysia, where she earned her bachelor's degree in agricultural science. Then she immigrated to the United Kingdom in 2013 to study genetics and bioinformatics for her Doctor of Philosophy (PhD) degree.

Yusoff started baking in 2017 and has reinvented British classic bakes with Malaysian flavours. She won the Star Baker award three consecutive times in the thirteenth series. Yusoff was crowned the 2022 winner and became the first Malaysian-born Bake Off winner after delivering her own "Summer Picnic" signature bake—pork-less pie alternative, heart-shaped tea sandwiches served "with broad bean and sauce verde", and Swiss rolls infused with elderflower—and her planet-themed Showstopper bake "This Is My Home".

Sandro Farmhouse
Nelsandro "Sandro" Farmhouse was a London nanny at the time of competition. Farmhouse was born in Angola. At age two, he and his mother escaped from the Angolan Civil War in early 1990s. His interest in baking rose after his father died in early 2010s when Farmhouse was twenty-one years old. He has run virtual baking lessons for autistic children. He won the Star Baker award in only the fifth (Desserts) week of the thirteenth series. Farmhouse became one of runners-up, losing to Syabira Yusoff.

Abdul Rehman Sharif
Abdul Rehman Sharif was a London electronics engineer at the time of competition. Born to his Pakistani parents, Sharif grew up in Saudi Arabia. He gained an interest in baking when he and his graduate colleagues exchanged their bakes during their coffee breaks. He studied engineering and mathematics during his academic years and later applied what he learned to his bakes. He won the Star Baker award only in the semifinal (Pâtisserie) week of the thirteenth series. Sharif became one of runners-up, losing to Syabira Yusoff.

See also
 List of The Great British Bake Off contestants
 List of The Great British Bake Off Star Bakers

References

General

Specific

Further reading
 

Great British Bake Off finalists (series 8-present)